is a railway station located in the town of  Mitake,  Gifu Prefecture,  Japan, operated by the private railway operator Meitetsu.

Lines

Station layout
Mitakeguchi Station has one ground-level side platform serving a single bi-directional track. There is no station building. The station is unattended.

Adjacent stations

History
It was renamed to its present name on April 1, 1952.

Surrounding area
Japan National Route 21

See also
 List of Railway Stations in Japan

References

External links
 
  

Railway stations in Japan opened in 1920
Stations of Nagoya Railroad
Railway stations in Gifu Prefecture
Mitake, Gifu